Kim Ho-nam (born June 14, 1989) is a South Korean football player who plays for Bucheon FC.

Club statistics

Honours
Pohang Steelers
AFC Champions League: 2021 (runners-up)

References

External links

1989 births
Living people
South Korean footballers
South Korean expatriate footballers
Association football forwards
Sagan Tosu players
Gwangju FC players
Jeju United FC players
Gimcheon Sangmu FC players
J2 League players
K League 1 players
K League 2 players
Expatriate footballers in Japan
South Korean expatriate sportspeople in Japan
People from Jeonju
Sportspeople from North Jeolla Province